Leonid Mikhailovich Shkadov (1927–2003)  scientist, engineer in aircraft development and optimisation, one of the TsAGI deputy directors (1986-2003), Doctor of Engineering, professor, recipient of the USSR State Prize (1977).

Shkadov came up with the idea of the Shkadov Thruster.

Awards and decorations 
 USSR State Prize (1977)
 Order of the Red Banner of Labour (1971) 
 Order of the Badge of Honour (1966) 
 Order of Friendship (1998) 
 Jubilee Medal "In Commemoration of the 100th Anniversary of the Birth of Vladimir Ilyich Lenin", Medal "Veteran of Labour" and Jubilee Medal "300 Years of the Russian Navy" (1997)
 Honoured Scientist of the RSFSR (1988)
 Honoured Aircraft Engineer of the USSR (1987)
 Zhukovsky Honorary Citizen

References 

1927 births
Soviet aerospace engineers
Russian aerospace engineers
People in aviation
Russian physicists
2003 deaths
Central Aerohydrodynamic Institute employees
Soviet physicists